This is part of a list of students of music, organized by teacher.

N

François Joseph Naderman

Giovanni Maria Nanino

Eduard Nápravník

James Nares

Pietro Nardini

Johann Naret-Koning

Pran Nath

Sufi Pir

Lev Naumov

Gaetano Nava

Karel Navrátil

Karl Navrátil

Grażyna Pstrokońska-Nawratil

Charles Neate

Christian Gottlob Neefe

Marcantonio Negri

August Neithardt

Dimitar Nenov

Heinrich Neuhaus

Sigismund von Neukomm

Arthur Newman

Jean Louis Nicodé

Willem Nicolaï

Ștefan Niculescu

Louis Niedermeyer

Carl Nielsen

 (1877–1937)
 (1899–1982)
 (1883–1962)
 (1897–1951)
 (1881–1949)
 (1899–1991)
 (1892–1974)
 (1908–1998)
 (1888–1949)
 (1897–1988)

Arthur Nikisch

Tatiana Nikolayeva

Henriette Nissen-Saloman

Luigi Nono

Per Nørgård

Homer Norris

Zygmunt Noskowski

K. P. H. Notoprojo

Also known to his students as "Pak Cokro".

Gustav Nottebohm

Vítězslav Novák

Vincent Novello

O

Lev Oborin

  
 

 

 
 
 
 

As assistant

Eugene O'Brien

Vincent O'Brien

Johannes Ockeghem

Arne Oldberg

Arthur O'Leary

Pauline Oliveros

Betty Ann Wong

František Ondříček

Giacomo Orefice

Buxton Orr

Robin Orr

Juan Orrego-Salas

William Ortiz-Alvarado

August von Othegraven

Ernst Julius Otto

Hall Overton

Frederick Ouseley

P

Pavel Pabst

Antonio Maria Pacchioni

Johann Pachelbel

Martijn Padding

Ignacy Jan Paderewski

John Knowles Paine

Giovanni Pierluigi da Palestrina

Robert Moffat Palmer

Selim Palmgren

Giacomo Panizza

Bindo Paoli

Rosa Papier

Pietro Domenico Paradies

Dorothy Parke

Horatio Parker

James Cutler Dunn Parker

Walter Parratt

Hubert Parry

Harry Partch

Bernardo Pasquini

Elizabeth Pastor

Ernst Pauer

Maggi Payne

František Martin Pecháček

Felip Pedrell

Frank Pelleg

Romain-Octave Pelletier I

Petros Peloponnesios

Joseph Pembaur

Krzysztof Penderecki

Johann Christoph Pepusch

Ernst Perabo

George Perle

Vlado Perlemuter

Vincent Persichetti

Louis Persinger

Giacomo Antonio Perti

Giovanni Battista Pescetti

Émile Pessard

Peter the Byzantine

Goffredo Petrassi

Egon Petri

Malcolm Peyton

Isidor Philipp

Burrill Phillips

Niccolò Piccinni

Gabriel Pierné

Henry Hugo Pierson

Willem Pijper

Pierre Pincemaille

André Pirro

Johann Georg Pisendel

Paul Pisk

Francesco Antonio Pistocchi

Walter Piston

Percy Pitt

Friedrich Wilhelm Pixis

Johann Peter Pixis

Ildebrando Pizzetti

Louis Plaidy

Nicolas Joseph Platel

Simone Plé-Caussade

Émile Poillot

Larry Polansky

Yuri Pomerantsiev

Herb Pomeroy

Amilcare Ponchielli

 (perhaps)

Marcel Poot

Nicola Porpora

Costanzo Porta

Quincy Porter

Cipriani Potter

Francis Poulenc

Henri Pousseur

Mel Powell

Louis-Barthélémy Pradher

Jacob Praetorius

Jacob Praetorius the Elder

Eddie Prévost

Gottfried von Preyer

Humphrey Procter-Gregg

Ignazio Prota

Ebenezer Prout

Francesco Provenzale

Giacomo Puccini

Gaetano Pugnani

Raoul Pugno

Vladimir Pukhal'ski

Henry Purcell

Veli-Matti Puumala

Johann Christoph Pyrlaeus

Q

Johann Joachim Quantz

Héctor Quintanar

References
Citations

Sources

 
 
 Gann, Kyle (1997). American Music in the Twentieth Century. Schirmer. .
 Green, Janet M. & Thrall, Josephine (1908). The American history and encyclopedia of music. I. Squire.
 Greene, David Mason (1985). Greene's Biographical Encyclopedia of Composers. Reproducing Piano Roll Fnd.. .
 Highfill, Philip H. (1991). A Biographical Dictionary of Actors, Actresses, Musicians, Dancers, Managers, and Other Stage Personnel in London, 1660 – 1800: S. Siddons to Thrnne, p. 234. SIU Press. .
 Hinkle-Turner, Elizabeth (2006). Women Composers and Music Technology in the United States: Crossing the Line. Ashgate Publishing. .
 Hinson, Maurice (2001). Music for More than One Piano: An Annotated Guide. Indiana University Press. .
 Jones, Barrie; ed. (2014). The Hutchinson Concise Dictionary of Music. Routledge. .
 Mason, Daniel Gregory (1917). The Art of Music: A Comprehensive Library of Information for Music Lovers and Musicians. The National Society of Music. . ( Related books via Google).
 McGraw, Cameron (2001). Piano Duet Repertoire: Music Originally Written for One Piano, Four Hands. Indian University. .
 
 
 Sadie, Julie Anne & Samuel, Rhian; eds. (1994). The Norton/Grove Dictionary of Women Composers. W. W. Norton & Company. .
  New Grove.
 Saxe Wyndham, Henry & L'Epine, Geoffrey; eds. (1915). Who's who in Music: A Biographical Record of Contemporary Musicians. I. Pitman & Sons.
 Wier, Albert Ernest (1938). The Macmillan encyclopedia of music and musicians. Macmillan.

Students by teacher